Euphthiracaridae is a family of mites in the order Oribatida.

Genera
 Rhysotritia
 Microtritia

References

Sarcoptiformes
Acari families